Mark Ralph Delano Cornell (born 30 May 1966) is a British businessman,  who was formerly CEO of Moët Hennessy USA, and is the current CEO of Ambassador Theatre Group.

References

1966 births
Living people